The VQ is a family of V6 24V automobile engines developed by Nissan with displacements varying from 2.0 L to 4.0 L. It is an aluminum block DOHC 4-valve (per cylinder) design with aluminum heads. It is fitted with Nissan's EGI/ECCS sequential multi-point fuel injection (MPFI) system. Later versions feature various implementations of variable valve timing and replace MPFI with direct fuel injection (marketed as NEO-Di). The VQ series engine was honored by Ward's 10 Best Engines list almost every year from the list's inception. The VQ series replaced the VG series of engines.

Versions
1st gen (1994-)
 VQ20DE
 VQ25DE 1st
 VQ30DE
 VQ30DET

2nd gen (2000-)
 VQ23DE (2003-)
 VQ25DE 2nd gen (2004-)
 VQ35DE (2000-)
 VQ40DE

3rd gen 
 VQ25HR
 VQ35HR (2006-)
 VQ37VHR (2008-)

DE series

VQ20DE
This DOHC 24-valve  V6 has bore and stroke dimensions of  respectively, along with a compression ratio ranging from 9.5 to 10.0:1.

It is fitted to the following vehicles:
 1994–2003 Nissan Cefiro A32 and A33
 1995–1999 Nissan QX A32
 1998–2005 Renault Samsung SM5 KPQ/A32

VQ23DE

The VQ23DE is a 2.3 L (2349 cc) engine equipped with CVTC (Continuously Variable-valve Timing Control).

It is fitted to the following vehicles:
 2003–2008 Nissan Teana 230JM-J31
 Nissan Cefiro (Neo VQ23)
 2006–2011 Renault Samsung SM7  (Neo VQ23)
 2008–2011 Renault Safrane  (Neo VQ23)

VQ25DE

This engine is similar to the VQ20DE, but has a  displacement. In some Nissans, this engine was replaced by the QR25DE.

 1994–1998 Nissan Cefiro (A32)
 2000–2003 Nissan Cefiro (A33)
 1996–1999 Nissan Leopard (FY33)
 1997–1999 Nissan Cedric (Y33)
 2004–2007 Nissan Fuga (Y50)
 2004–2007 Infiniti M (Y50)
 2004–2010 Nissan Elgrand (E51)
 2008–2011 Nissan Teana (J32)
 1998–2005 Renault Samsung SM5 (KPQ/A32)
 2010–2019 Renault Samsung SM5 (L43) 
 2010–2015 Renault Latitude (L43)

VQ25DET
The VQ25DET is a turbocharged  engine with CVTC.

It is fitted to the following vehicles:
 2001–2004 Nissan Stagea 250t RS FOUR V, 250t RX FOUR and AR-X FOUR (NM-35)
 2001–2004 Autech Axis (NM35)

VQ30DE

The  VQ30DE has a bore and stroke of  respectively with a compression ratio of 10.0:1. The VQ30DE was on the Ward's 10 Best Engines list from 1995 through 2001. It is an aluminum open deck block design with microfinished internals and a relatively light weight.

An improved version of the VQ30DE is known by the designation VQ30DE-K. The K designation stands for the Japanese word kaizen which translates to "improvement". The engine was used in the 2000–2001 Nissan Maxima and adds a true dual-runner intake manifold for better high-end performance compared to some earlier Japanese and Middle-East market versions of this engine (2000-2001 Infiniti I30 models added an additional fenderwell intake, boosting power to ). The VQ30DEK produces . The 1995–1999 US spec VQ30DE was equipped with only a single runner intake manifold.

 1994–1998 Nissan Cefiro (A32),  and 
 1995–1999 Nissan QX (A32)
 1995–1999 Nissan Maxima (A32),  and 
 1996–1999 Infiniti I30 (A32),  and 
 2000–2001 Infiniti I30 (A33),  and 
 1999–2003 Nissan Bassara U30,  and 
 1998–2003 Nissan Presage U30,  and 
 2002–2004 Dallara SN01, World Series by Nissan

VQ30DET
The  VQ30DET is a turbocharged version of the VQ30DE. Bore and stroke remain the same at  respectively, and it has a compression ratio of 9.0:1.

It is fitted to the following vehicles:
 1995–2004 Nissan Gloria Y33, Y34
 1995–2004 Nissan Cedric Y33, Y34
 1996–1999 Nissan Leopard Y33
 1996–2001 Nissan Cima Y33
 2001–2007 Nissan Cima F50

VQ30DETT

The twin-turbo VQ30DETT is an engine used only in Nissan's race cars, primarily in the Super GT (formerly the JGTC). First used on the Skyline GT-R race cars during the 2002 season, this engine subsequently powered the Fairlady Z race cars. Homologation rules allow them to use the VQ30DETT in lieu of the stock VQ35DE.

The VQ30DETT was replaced in 2007 by the VK45DE for use in the Super GT Fairlady Z's and later in the GT-R.

It was utilized in the following vehicles:
 2002–2003 Skyline GT-R JGTC race cars (Non-Production)
 2004 Fairlady Z JGTC race cars (Non-Production)
 2005–2006 Fairlady Z Super GT race cars (Non-Production)

VQ35DE

The  VQ35DE is used in many modern Nissan vehicles. It uses a similar block design to the VQ30DE, but adds variable valve timing (CVTCS).

The VQ35DE is built in Iwaki and Decherd, TN. It was on the Ward's 10 Best Engines list from 2002 through to 2007 and again in 2016.
It features forged steel connecting rods, a microfinished one-piece forged crankshaft, and Nissan's nylon intake manifold technology. It has low-friction molybdenum-coated pistons and the intake is a high-flow tuned induction system. Since its inception Nissan has improved upon the VQ35DE with changes keeping it an efficient class leading V6 engine. The engine was updated in 2005 as the VQ35HR (High-Rev). It included exhaust timing, a higher rev limit, as well as minor internal upgrades boosting the output to 313 horsepower.

A modified version of the VQ35DE, called the S1, is produced by Nismo (Nissan's motorsports and performance division) for the Fairlady Z S-Tune GT. It produces  at 7,200 rpm, a higher rev-limit than that of the original VQ35DE.

North American

JDM and other markets

VQ40DE

The VQ40DE is a  longer stroke variant of the VQ35DE. Compression ratio is 9.7:1

Improvements include continuously variable valve timing, variable intake system, silent timing chain, hollow and lighter camshafts and friction reduction (microfinished surfaces, moly coated pistons). It is port fuel injected with platinum-tipped spark plugs.

DD series

The DD series is a variant of the DE series engines with direct fuel injection (NEO-Di) and eVTC (electronically controlled continuously variable valve timing).

VQ25DD

The  engine has Bore and stroke of 85 mm and 73.3 mm respectively, with a compression ratio of 11 to 11.3:1.

It is fitted to the following vehicles:
 1999–2002 Nissan Cefiro A33,  (JDM)
 1999–2004 Nissan Cedric/Nissan Gloria
 2001–2006 Nissan Skyline V35, 
 2001–2007 Nissan Stagea M35,

VQ30DD
The  engine has Bore and stroke of 93 mm and 73.3 mm, with a compression ratio of 11.0:1.

It is fitted to the following vehicles:
 1997–1999 Nissan Leopard Y33  and 
 1999–2004 Nissan Cedric Y34
 1999–2004 Nissan Gloria Y34  and 
 2001–2004 Nissan Skyline V35
 2001–2004 Nissan Stagea M35  and

VQ35DD

A larger 3.5L with direct-injection is released for 2017 model year.

It is fitted to the following vehicles:
2017–present Nissan Pathfinder 
2017–present Infiniti QX60

VQ38DD
A 3.8 L version with direct-injection is released for 2020 model year.

It is fitted to the following vehicles:
2020–present Nissan Frontier

HR series

VQ25HR

The 2.5 L VQ25HR (for "High Revolution" or "High Response") is only offered on longitudinally-mounted engine vehicles which tend to be rear wheel drive or all-wheel drive. It has dual CVTC for both intake and exhaust, microfinished camshafts and a redline of 7,500 rpm.

It is fitted to the following vehicles:

VQ35HR

The VQ35HR engine was first seen in the US with the introduction of the updated 2007 G35 Sedan model, which debuted in August 2006. Nissan updated the VQ line with the addition of the 3.5 L VQ35HR (for "High Revolution"). As of 2009, the Infiniti EX35 produces  and the same torque presumably due to tighter regulations. It has NDIS (Nissan Direct Ignition System) and CVTC with hydraulic actuation on the intake cam and electromagnetic on the exhaust cam. Redline is 7,600 rpm. Reportedly over 80% of the internal components were redesigned or strengthened to handle an increased RPM range sporting a lofty 7,600 rpm redline. A new dual-path intake (two air cleaners, throttle bodies, etc.) lowers intake tract restriction by 18 percent and new equal-length exhaust manifolds lead into mufflers that are 25 percent more free-flowing for all around better airflow. The electrically actuated variable valve timing on the exhaust cams to broaden the torque curve is new over the "DE" engine. The new engine block retained the same bore and stroke, but the connecting rods were lengthened and the block deck was raised by 8.4 mm to reduce piston side-loads. This modification, along with the use of larger crank bearings with main bearing caps reinforced by a rigid ladder-type main cap girdle to allow the engine reliably rev to 7600 rpm. With an increase in compression ratio from 10.3:1 to 10.6:1 these changes add 6 more horsepower ( total + 3 hp ram air effect not measured by SAE testing = ). Peak torque is up 8 pound-feet from the older "DE" engine,  vs  and the torque curve is higher and flatter across most of the rpm range, and especially in the lower rpm range. The VQ35HR was utilized in rear-wheel-drive platforms while the VQ35DE continued to power Nissan's front-wheel-drive vehicles. In 2010, Nissan introduced a hybrid version of the VQ35HR, pairing the engine to a lithium-ion battery pack.

VQ38HR
By 2007, Nissan's ambition to increase the competitiveness of the Z33 chassis in Super Taikyu racing resulted in the development of a larger displacement engine based on the original VQ35HR Block. The end result was the VQ38HR powered Nismo Type 380RS-C which went on to dominate ST class 1 racing. In order to use this new engine in Super GT GT500, limited numbers of the engine were reproduced in the street-legal Fairlady Z Nismo Type 380RS. The VQ38HR engine mounted in the 380RS is a detuned, street version of the racing engine used in the 380RS-C. The engine displacement remains the same, while the intake manifold and exhaust, air-fuel ratio, ignition timing, VTC and other specs have been optimized for street use.

The VQ38HR fitted to the following vehicles:
 2007–2008 Nissan Fairlady Z Version Nismo Type 380RS-C
 2007–2008 Nissan Fairlady Z Version Nismo Type 380RS

Production
The VQ35HR and VQ25HR engines were built at Nissan's Iwaki Plant in Fukushima Prefecture.

VHR series

The VHR series is a variation of the VQ-HR engine series with Nissan's VVEL (Variable Valve Event and Lift).

VQ37VHR

It was the first production engine from Nissan using VVEL. 

See also
 List of Nissan engines
 World series by Nissan

References

External link

VQ
V6 engines
Gasoline engines by model